K. SUGUMAR is an Indian politician and was a member of the Parliament of India from Pollachi Constituency. He represents the All India Anna Dravida Munnetra Kazhagam party.

References 

Living people
India MPs 2009–2014
All India Anna Dravida Munnetra Kazhagam politicians
Lok Sabha members from Tamil Nadu
People from Coimbatore district
Year of birth missing (living people)
Amma Makkal Munnetra Kazhagam politicians